An ear saver, also known as mask strain release strap or mask extender, is an accessory to personal protective equipment (PPE), relieves strain on a mask wearer's ears created through the loops of masks. Ear savers were designed as novel items during the COVID-19 pandemic by the open-source hardware community in response to requests from medical professionals reporting heavy strain on their ears. Ear savers have since been commercialized for a broader population of users as the pandemic wore on.

Manufacturing 
Four methods are used to manufacture ear savers: 3D printing, laser cutting, injection molding and sewing (a modified version with crocheted buttons on a headband). During the COVID-19 pandemic, the maker movement alone produced more than 2.2 million ear savers.

See also 

 Maker culture
 Face masks during the COVID-19 pandemic

References 

Emergency medical equipment
Headgear
Protective gear